The Alcor  Junior  was a small, six passenger, twin-engined airliner built in the U.S. and flown in 1938. As on Alcor's earlier Duo-4 and Duo-6, its inline engines were mounted horizontally to minimize their separation and drag. Only one was built; it was lost in a crash less than four months after its first flight.

Design and development

The C-6-1 was a low wing airliner of mixed wood and metal construction. Its wings were tapered in plan, ending in semi-elliptical tips, and were built around twin spars. Its ribs were steel tube girder structures in inner, high stress regions around engine and undercarriage attachment points but were spruce girders elsewhere. Wing covering was largely plywood, except close to fuel tanks where duralumin was used. The trailing edges carried hydraulically operated flaps and Frise ailerons.

Though in the high wing Duo-4 and -6 the engines were mounted on the sides of the forward fuselage, the low wing of the C-6-1 enabled their attachment, cylinder heads together, to the forward wing spars, with steel trusses distributing loads to the rear spars. Their cowlings formed a local, inner extension of the leading edges. Their positioning brought the propeller tips to within .

The forward fuselage, which included the engine and wing mountings, had a steel tube frame and was skinned with light alloy. Behind the cockpit the fuselage became a semi-monocoque wooden structure, with spruce frames and longerons under pressure-formed two-ply shell. The cockpit had seating for two with dual controls and the passenger cabin behind had three rows of seats in pairs either side of a central aisle. At the rear of the cabin there was a toilet and a baggage compartment with a radio cabin behind it.

The C-6-1 had a conventional cantilever tail formed from plywood over wood frames. The horizontal tail, mounted on the top of the fuselage, was narrow and straight-edged but the vertical tail was much broader and curved, its dorsal fin rising slowly from the fuselage. Control surfaces were balanced and fitted with trim tabs.

Its main landing gear was retractable, with oleo legs retracting rearwards and rotating axially through 90° so the wheels, equipped with brakes, lay flat in the wings. The faired, oleo-legged tailwheel did not retract but lockably swivelled for ground manoeuvres.

The first flight of the C-6-1 was made on March 6, 1938 and a brief development program showed good handling. However, during a test flight on June 27, 1938 the pilot initiated a high speed dive, not part of the flight program, from which he could not recover. The two crew escaped by parachute over San Francisco Bay, but the financial consequences ended Alcor Aircraft.

Specifications

References

Twin piston-engined tractor aircraft
Low-wing aircraft
1930s United States airliners
Junior
Aircraft first flown in 1938